Marian Adrian Chițu (born 19 August 1986 in Timișoara) is a Romanian former football player.

Poli Timișoara
He was promoted to first team in the Winters of year 2010 where he waited for his dream debut in Liga I for FC Timișoara.
Finally, on 5 March he was announced in "First Eleven" (11) match against Rapid București.

Concordia Chiajna
On 4 August 2010 he was loaned to Liga II team Concordia Chiajna.

References

External links
 
 

1986 births
Living people
Romanian footballers
FC Gloria Buzău players
FC Politehnica Timișoara players
CS Concordia Chiajna players
ACF Gloria Bistrița players
LPS HD Clinceni players
CS Sportul Snagov players
FC Dunărea Călărași players
Liga I players
Liga II players
Association football defenders
Sportspeople from Timișoara